Ahm is a surname, and notable people with the surname include:

 Maria Ahm (born 1998), Danish athlete
 Povl Ahm (1926–2005), Danish engineer
 Tonny Ahm (1914–1993), Danish badminton player

Surnames of Danish origin